Mount Aitken, is a  mountain in the Miscinchinka Ranges of the Hart Ranges in the Northern Rocky Mountains.

Named to remember Canadian Army Lieut. John Alexander Aitken, of Prince George, BC, killed in action 27 August 1944, age 27. Aitken enlisted the day Canada declared war in September 1939; transferred to Prince Rupert, BC and trained as an Artillery Officer.  He volunteered to be transferred to the British Army in May 1944 and was killed his first day in action, while crossing the Seine River. (November 1993 letter from his widow, Josephine, file M.2.57).

The Commonwealth War Graves Commission indicates that Lieut. Aitken was serving with the 227th Infantry Brigade, 2nd Btn Gordon Highlanders, RCIC, when he was killed. He is buried at Bretteville-Sur-Laize Canadian War Cemetery, Calvados, France, Grave XXVIII. F. 4.

References 

Canadian Rockies
One-thousanders of British Columbia
Northern Interior of British Columbia
Cariboo Land District